Alma Matters: Inside the IIT Dream is an Indian documentary web series that is directed by Pratik Patra and Prashant Raj, produced by Dopamine Media and Entertainment. The series starred Shubham Agarwal, Kevin Banker, Lokesh Deshmukh, Mukul Sankule, Adarsh Upadhyay, Kumar Gaurav and many more.

Cast
 Shubham Agarwal
 Kevin Banker
 Lokesh Deshmukh
 Mukul Sankule
 Kartikeya Singh
 Adarsh Upadhyay
 Kumar Gaurav
 Gaurav Katam
 Biswa Kalyan Rath
 Spandana Silla

Release
The series trailer was released on 24 April 2021 and it was released on 15 May 2021 and the series is available on Netflix.

Review 
The Hindu wrote The three-part series on life inside the hallowed halls of India’s premier educational institution fails to probe into the true nature of the students’ experience

References

External links
 

Hindi-language web series
2021 Indian television seasons
Indian web series